A restricted-access barrier system (RABS) is an installation which is used in many industries, such as pharmaceutical, medical, chemical, electrical engineering where a controlled atmosphere is needed.  The RABS provides a physical barrier between workers and production areas.

See also
 Clean room

References

Filters
Perimeter security
Security